Seagoe Station which was opened on 31 January 1842 by the Ulster Railway Co. and closed on 12 September 1842 when the railway line was completed as far as Portadown and Portadown railway station was opened to passengers on the 12 September 1842  The former station is on the mainline between Lurgan and Portadown on the Belfast-Newry and Dublin Connolly line, located in County Armagh, Northern Ireland.

References

Disused railway stations in County Armagh
Railway stations in the Republic of Ireland opened in 1842
Railway stations in Northern Ireland opened in the 19th century